Arthur Lawson may refer to:

 Arthur Lawson (police officer), chief of police of the Louisiana city of Gretna
 Arthur Lawson (designer) (1908–1970), British art director